Field Marshal Thanom Kittikachorn (11 August 1911 – 16 June 2004) was the leader of Thailand from 1963 to 1973, during which he staged a self-coup, until public protests which exploded into violence forced him to step down.  His return from exile in 1976 sparked protests which led to a massacre of demonstrators, followed by a military coup.

Early life
Thanom Kittikachorn was born in Tak Province to Khun Amphan Kittikachorn and his wife, Mrs Linchee Kittikachorn. His family was of Thai Chinese descent. He attended Wat Koak Plu Municipal School, then was admitted to the Army Cadet Academy. After receiving his commission, he reported for duty with Infantry Regiment VII in Chiang Mai. Thanom later studied at the Cartography School and the Infantry School, and graduated from the National Defense College in its first class.

Rise to power

After serving in the Shan States of Burma during the British Colonial destruction, then Lieutenant Colonel Thanom took part in a successful 1957 coup headed by Colonel Sarit Thanarat. He became a regimental commander and was head of the Lopburi military department. He was soon promoted to colonel, commanding the 11th Infantry Division. Thanom was appointed a member of parliament in 1951, his first political role. He was promoted to major general the same year.

In February 1953, Thanom led the suppression of a rebellion against military rule, and was rewarded with promotion to lieutenant general. He represented Thailand at the ceremony to mark the end of the Korean War in July 1953 and was later promoted as commander of the 1st Region Army.

He was appointed deputy cooperatives minister in 1955. Thanom supported Sarit in his coup against the government of Field Marshal Plaek Phibunsongkhram, and was subsequently appointed defence minister in Pote Sarasin's puppet regime in 1957. Thanom consolidated his power base as the second military leader and right-hand man of Sarit. A few days after the December 1957 general election, in which the pro-government Sahaphum Party ("United Land") had performed disappointingly, Thanom co-founded the National Socialist Party (Chat Sangkhomniyom). He became the deputy leader of this party, designed to extend the pro-government camp and win over former members of Phibunsongkhram's Seri Manangkhasila Party who had been reelected to parliament as independents.

In 1958, he was made a full general and assumed the offices of prime minister and defence minister. He was prime minister for nine months, after which he was replaced by Sarit himself and made deputy prime minister, defence minister, and armed forces deputy supreme commander.

Prime minister of Thailand

Prime Minister Thanom succeeded his predecessor one day after Sarit's death in 1963. He subsequently appointed himself commander-in-chief of the army. One year later, he promoted himself to the concurrent ranks of field marshal, admiral of the fleet, and Marshal of the Royal Thai Air Force. Thanom continued the pro-American and anti-communist politics of his predecessor, which helped to ensure massive US economic and financial aid during the Vietnam War. Although he was personally popular, his regime was known for massive corruption. He established and led the United Thai People's Party (Saha Prachathai) in October 1968.

Thanom reappointed himself prime minister in February 1969 after general elections had been completed. The following year saw the beginnings of the 1970s peasant revolts in Thailand. Then, in November 1971, he staged a coup against his own government, citing the need to suppress communist infiltration. He dissolved parliament and appointed himself Chairman of the National Executive Council, and served as a caretaker government for one year. In December 1972, he appointed himself prime minister for a fourth time, also serving as the defence and foreign ministers. Thanom, his son Colonel Narong, and Narong's father-in-law General Praphas Charusathien became known as the "three tyrants".

Public discontent grew, along with demands for a general election to choose a new parliament. Student-led demands for a return to constitutional government, the so-called "14 October 1973 uprising", led to three days of violence followed by the sudden downfall of his government. Thanom and the other "tyrants" flew to exile in the United States and Singapore. Thanom's departure was followed by a restoration of a democratic rule in Thailand.

After Thammasat University massacre

In October 1976, Thanom returned to Thailand in the robes of a novice monk, to stay at Bangkok's Wat Bowonniwet. Even though he announced he had no desire to enter politics, his return triggered student protests, which eventually moved onto the campus of Thammasat University. This was only a year after South Vietnam and Thailand's neighbors Laos and Cambodia had fallen to the communists, and right-wing Thais suspected the protesters wished the same fate for their own country. On 6 October 1976, right-wing militants, aided by government security forces, stormed the Thammasat campus, violently broke up the protests, and killed many protesters. That evening, the military seized power from the elected civilian government of Democrat MR Seni Pramoj and installed hard-line royalist Thanin Kraivichien as premier.

Thanom soon left the monkhood, but he kept his word never to take part in politics again. Late in his life, he attempted to rehabilitate his tarnished image and recover properties seized when his government was overthrown.

In March 1999, Thanom was nominated to be a member of the honorary Royal Guard by Prime Minister Chuan Leekpai, which led to controversy. Thanom settled the matter himself by turning down the appointment.

Thanom Kittikachorn died in 2004 the age of 92 in Bangkok General Hospital, after suffering a stroke and a heart attack two years earlier. His family's medical expenses were paid by King Bhumibol Adulyadej, which some saw as payback for Thanom's agreeing to the king's request that he leave the country to end the violence in 1973. Thanom's cremation was held on 25 February 2007 at Wat Debsirin. Queen Sirikit presided over the cremation ceremony, lighting the royal flame on behalf of King Bhumibol. Her youngest daughter, the Princess Chulabhorn, was also present. Thanom's wife died in 2012, aged 96.

Honours
Thanom received the following royal decorations in the Honours System of Thailand:
 1961 -  Knight Grand Cross (First Class) of The Most Illustrious Order of Chula Chom Klao
 1965 -  Knight Grand Commander of the Honourable Order of Rama
 1956 -  Knight Grand Cordon (Special Class) of the Most Exalted Order of the White Elephant
 1955 -  Knight Grand Cordon (Special Class) of The Most Noble Order of the Crown of Thailand
 1988 -  Order of Symbolic Propitiousness Ramkeerati (Special Class)
 1972 -  Bravery Medal with wreath  
 1962 -  Victory Medal - World War II
 1955 -  Victory Medal - Korean War (with flames)
 1972 -  Victory Medal - Vietnam War (with flames)
 1969 -  Freeman Safeguarding Medal (First Class)
 1934 -  Safeguarding the Constitution Medal 
 1943 -  Medal for Service Rendered in the Interior
 1962 -  Border Service Medal
 1944 -  Chakra Mala Medal
 1950 -  King Rama VIII Royal Cypher Medal, Third Class
 1964 -  King Rama IX Royal Cypher Medal, First Class
 1972 -  Red Cross Medal of Appreciation, First Class

Foreign honours

  :

 United Nations Korea Medal

  :

 Chief Commander of the Legion of Merit

  :

 Grand Cross of the Order of the Dannebrog

  :

 Grand Cross of the Order of Christ (G.C.C.)

 :

 Grand Cross 1st Class of the Order of Merit of the Federal Republic of Germany

 :

 Grand Cross of the Order of Civil Merit

 Grand Cross with White Decoration of the Order of Military Merit

  :

 Grand Cross of the Order of the Oak Crown

  :

 Commander Grand Cross of the Royal Order of the Sword

  :

 Grand Cross of the Order of Saint Sylvester

 :

 Grand Cross of the Order of Merit of the Italian Republic(O.M.R.I.)

  :

 Grand Cross of the Order of Orange-Nassau

  :

 Grand Cordon of the  Order of Leopold

 :

 Star of the Republic of Indonesia, 1st Class

  :

 Grand Cross of the Order of the Liberator General San Martín

  :

 Special Grand Cordon of the Order of the Sacred Tripod

 Special Grand Cordon of the Order of the Cloud and Banner

 Special Breast Order of Yun Hui

 Special Grand Cordon of the Order of Brilliant Star

 

 Grand Cordon of the Order of the Rising Sun

  :

 Grand Cross of the Order of the Million Elephants and the White Parasol

 :

 Grand Collar of the Order of Sikatuna

 Chief Commander of the Legion of Honor

  :

 Honorary Grand Cross of the Order of St Michael and St George  (G.C.M.G.)

 :

 Grand Cross of the National Order of Vietnam

 Kim Khanh Decoration, Exceptional class

 :

 Grand Cross of the Order of the Holy Trinity

 

 Republic of Korea Medal of the Order of Merit for National Foundation

 Order of Military Merit, 1st Class

 Blue Stripes of the Order of Service Merit
 :
 Honorary Grand Commander of the Order of the Defender of the Realm (1962) (S.M.N.)
  :
 Grand Star of the Decoration of Honour for Services to the Republic of Austria

References

External links
 KITTIKACHORN, Field Marshal Thanom
 "Thanom's sometimes turbulent life"
 Thailand Government

|-

1911 births
2004 deaths
Thanom Kittikachorn
Thanom Kittikachorn
Thanom Kittikachorn
People of the Vietnam War
Thanom Kittikachorn
Thanom Kittikachorn
Thanom Kittikachorn
Leaders ousted by a coup
Thanom Kittikachorn
Thanom Kittikachorn
Thanom Kittikachorn
Thanom Kittikachorn
Thanom Kittikachorn
Thanom Kittikachorn
Thanom Kittikachorn
Thanom Kittikachorn
Grand Crosses 1st class of the Order of Merit of the Federal Republic of Germany
Politicide perpetrators
Exiled politicians
Thanom Kittikachorn
Honorary Knights Grand Cross of the Order of St Michael and St George
Thanom Kittikachorn
Thanom Kittikachorn